Mamidikuduru mandal is one of the 22 mandals in Konaseema district of Andhra Pradesh. As per census 2011, there are 17 villages in this mandal.

Demographics 
Mamidikuduru mandal has total population of 70,369 as per the 2011 Census out of which 35,506 are males while 35,133 are females. The average sex ratio is 989. The total literacy rate is 82%.

Towns and villages

Villages 
1. Adurru
2. Appanapalle
3. Botlaqewe Doddavaram
4. Edarada
5. Geddada
6. Gogannamattam
7. Komarada
8. Lutukurru
9. Magatapalle
10. Makanapalem
11. Mamidikuduru
12. Mogalikuduru
13. Nagaram
14. Pasarlapudi
15. Pasarlapudilanka
16. Pedapatnam

See also 
List of mandals in Andhra Pradesh

References 

Mandals in Konaseema district
Mandals in Andhra Pradesh